The Cadillac STS (Seville Touring Sedan) is a mid-sized luxury 4-door sedan manufactured and marketed by General Motors from 2004 to 2011 for the 2005 to 2011 model years.  A version of the STS was sold in China as the SLS through 2013.  It was equipped with a six-speed automatic transmission with performance algorithm shifting and driver shift control.

Origins 
The STS was the successor to the Cadillac Seville, which beginning in 1987 was available as an upscale performance-oriented STS (for Seville Touring Sedan) version.

While smaller than the full-size DTS, the more expensive STS was the flagship sedan of the Cadillac brand.

Safety 
The Cadillac STS was rated with a four star frontal and five star rear passenger crash test rating from the National Highway Traffic Safety Administration.  It was given an overall "Good" score in the Insurance Institute for Highway Safety frontal crash test and an "Acceptable" rating in the side impact test.  In the side impact test injury measurements to the driver's pelvis was rated "Poor" and for the torso "Acceptable."

2005-2007 
The front wheel drive Seville model name was retired in 2004, succeeded by an entirely new "STS" based on the rear wheel drive GM Sigma platform. The first Cadillac sedan to be offered with All wheel drive, it retained the Seville's high-performance Magnetic Ride Control suspension.  The Cadillac STS was assembled at GM's Lansing Grand River facility in Lansing, Michigan along with the smaller CTS sedan.

All engine models feature dual overhead camshafts with variable valve timing. Remote ignition is standard.

A heads-up display was optional, as was a 300-watt Bose stereo system with MP3 capability. Base pricing at launch ranged from US$40,575 for the V6 model to US$47,025 for the V8.

2008-2011 
The STS was updated for 2008. Changes included a refreshed exterior, with styling cues resembling the 2008 CTS, such as larger, more aggressive grille and chrome fender vents. The interior was updated, with new materials and a new steering wheel (like the one from the second-generation CTS), though the overall interior design remained the same, despite previous rumors of an all-new interior similar to that of the Chinese-market SLS. It also offered enhanced safety features, including a lane departure warning system developed by Mobileye, a blind spot monitoring system, and an improved version of GM's StabiliTrak stability control system, which could operate the steering system in addition to the brakes to help correct a skid. Additionally, options previously limited to the V8 model (such as HID headlamps and Automotive head-up display) were available with the V6. The 2008 Cadillac STS debuted at the 2007 New York Auto Show.

A 2010 update for the STS removed the GM badges, although early 2010 models still retained GM badging.  For 2011, the V8 was dropped from the Cadillac STS lineup.

STS-V 

The Cadillac STS-V is a high-performance executive car of the V-Series introduced at the 2005 Detroit Auto Show, and was available for sale in late 2005.

This engine is mated to a driver-adjustable GM automatic transmission with two shifting modes, larger brakes by Brembo, larger 10 spoke alloy wheels (18"x8.5" front, 19"x9.5" rear), Pirelli run-flat tires, a faster steering ratio, and a stiffer suspension than the standard STS. The engine block and cylinder heads are aluminum, the camshafts are cast iron, and the crankshaft is forged steel. Suspension is fully independent and there are four settings for the traction control system and stability control. Also different from the standard STS, the STS-V has a cooler for the rear differential oil located on the underside of the car behind the 3rd member.

Engine
Displacement: 
Power:  at 6400 rpm (SAE-certified)
Torque:  at 3900 rpm
Redline: 6700 rpm
Compression ratio: 9.0:1
Fuel economy: EPA est. / (City/highway) 13/19 - real world is about 14 mpg city and 21 to 23 mpg highway.

Performance
The STS-V had a 0- acceleration time of 4.6 seconds and a 13.2 second quarter mile time.

Appearance
The STS-V's primary visual difference from the standard STS was a wire mesh grille and a 'power-dome' hood as well as six lug wheels normally seen only on larger SUVs, trucks and pickups. In addition to the grille, the front differences include the bumper, the fog light and turning signal cluster, and the hood which is slightly domed to fit over the supercharger. In the rear, the bumper is different from the standard STS and includes a wire mesh insert at the bottom which is made of the same mesh material used in the front grille. The rear spoiler is taller and wider, and encompasses the third brake light.

For the interior, the STS-V also has upgraded leather and suede trim contracted from the German company Dräxlmaier, whose prior credit includes the Maybach 57 and 62. Interior color choices were Ebony and Gray, both of which are offered on the standard STS as well, and a two-tone Ebony/Tango Red scheme which was unique to the STS-V.

Production numbers

The model was discontinued in 2009.

Chinese Cadillac SLS 

The Chinese market received the Cadillac SLS  (for Seville Luxury Sedan) in November 2006 for the 2007 model year.  It was assembled by Shanghai GM.  Compared to the STS, the SLS has a longer wheelbase, unique interior appointments, and a near-identical exterior appearance. Engine choices included the 2.8-liter LP1  V-6, 3.6 LY7 V-6 and the 4.6-liter Northstar V-8 as in the STS V-8  from 2007 to 2009. The 3.6 liter LLT engine was available from 2010 to 2011  until it was replaced by the 2.0 liter LDK and the 3.0 liter LF1 V6 for 2011 to 2013 models.

The Chinese-Spec SLS received a facelift at the end of 2009, and was sold as a 2010 model year. The grille, bumper and many other details were revised. It was available in 5 trim levels known as: 2.8 Elite, 2.8 Luxury, 3.6 Elite, 3.6 Luxury and 4.6 Flagship. The SLS was priced from 448,000RMB to 828,000RMB  ($94,835 to $175,160 US - August 2022 exchange rate).

GM discontinued the production of the SLS in February 2013.

Sales

Successor
The final STS was assembled on May 4, 2011. The enlarged third generation rear-wheel drive CTS sedan introduced in 2013 as a 2014 model, similar in size and price to the STS, effectively succeeded it.

References

External links 

STS
Executive cars
Mid-size cars
Luxury vehicles
All-wheel-drive vehicles
Flagship vehicles
2010s cars
Vehicles built in Lansing, Michigan
Sports sedans
Cars introduced in 2004
Motor vehicles manufactured in the United States